Microwave digestion is a common technique used by elemental scientists to dissolve heavy metals in the presence of organic molecules prior to analysis by inductively coupled plasma, atomic absorption, or atomic emission measurements.

This technique is usually accomplished by exposing a sample to a strong acid in a closed vessel and raising the pressure and temperature through microwave irradiation. This increase in temperature and pressure of the low pH sample medium increases both the speed of thermal decomposition of the sample and the solubility of heavy metals in solution. Once these heavy metals are in solution, it is possible to quantify the sample through elemental techniques. A program can be configured in the microwave, establishing a series of temperature ramps. The temperature in the interior of the vessel is monitored by an infrared external sensor or by a optic fiber probe, and the microwave power is regulated to maintain the temperature defined by the active program. The vessel solution must contain at least one solvent that absorbs microwave radiation, usually water. 

Before the microwave digestion technology was developed, digestion of samples was made by heating vessels in a stove, typically for at least 24 hours. The use of microwave energy allows a much faster sample heating, so digestions time can be reduced to 1 hour.

References

Footnotes

Bibliography

Analytical chemistry